Heather Renee Penney is a defense policy expert at the Mitchell Institute for Aerospace Studies in Arlington, Virginia. She is best known for her role as a USAF lieutenant who was one of two F-16 pilots who flew their unarmed planes in an attempt to ram and down United Airlines Flight 93 before it reached Washington, D.C., during the September 11, 2001, terrorist attacks.

Early life
Heather Penney majored in literature at Purdue University. Her father was retired Air Force Col. John Penney (born 1947), who served from 1970 to 1979 during the Vietnam War and joined United Airlines in 1979 and served until his retirement in 2007.

Career

Air National Guard
Penney was the "only woman in her fighter pilot training class and the only woman in her fighter squadron", the 121st Fighter Squadron of the District of Columbia Air National Guard, stationed at Joint Base Andrews. In 2009, she transferred to the 201st Airlift Squadron, which provides short notice worldwide transportation for the Executive Branch, Congressional Members, Department of Defense officials and high-ranking U.S. and foreign dignitaries.

September 11 attacks
Penney, who was a first lieutenant at the time, was ordered into the air in her F-16 fighter jet alongside Marc H. Sasseville's aircraft at Andrews Air Force Base as the terrorist attacks were unfolding on September 11, 2001. They were ordered to down United Flight 93 before it reached the Washington, D.C. airspace, but because of the urgency, there was not enough time to outfit their aircraft with live ammunition. The mission could only have been accomplished by ramming the plane with their respective fighter jets. Penney and Sasseville were never able to intercept United 93, as it had crashed at least 35 minutes before they took off, and likely would have reached Washington 15 minutes prior to being airborne. In the Washington Post, Penney described her willingness to down Flight 93 without using live ammunition, saying that "there are things in this world that are more important than ourselves. [...] We belong to something greater than ourselves. As complex and diverse and discordant as it is, this thing, this idea called America, binds us together in citizenship and community and brotherhood."

Iraq War
She served two tours of duty in the Iraq war.

Private sector
In 2006, Penney joined Lockheed Martin as director of USAF Air Superiority Programs, Aviation Systems, Lockheed Martin Washington Operations while still serving part-time with the Air National Guard. At Lockheed Martin, she was working for Lockheed Martin on the F-35 project. On September 7, 2017, Penney and her father, John Penney, gave a lecture, titled 9/11 Perspectives at National Air and Space Museum, as part of the GE Aviation Lecture Series. After leaving Lockheed in 2018, Penney joined the think tank Mitchell Institute for Aerospace Studies as a defense policy expert.

Awards and honors
In 2012, Penney received the Emerging Voice Award from the Purdue University College of Liberal Arts and the Purdue Alumni Association. She was given the 2017 Outstanding Aviator Award from The Wings Club Foundation and the International Aviation Womens Association.

References

Living people
Year of birth missing (living people)
United Airlines Flight 93
Women in the United States Air Force
American women aviators
Purdue University alumni
United States Air Force personnel of the Iraq War
Lockheed Martin people
21st-century American women